Ixia scillaris is a perennial cormous flowering plant in the genus Ixia. It is endemic to a small portion of the Fynbos in the Western Cape.

Distribution 
Its range is from Tulbagh and Darling to the Cape Peninsula and Somerset West.

Subspecies 
There are 3 infraspecific names; 2 subspecies and 1 variety of the species scillaris:

 Ixia scillaris subsp. scillaris
 Ixia scillaris subsp. toximontana Goldblatt & J.C.Manning
 Ixia scillaris var. latifolia Ker Gawl.

Conservation status 

There are between 15 and 20 locations remaining, which continue to decline due to ongoing habitat loss and degradation, along with competition from alien invasive plants; as such, it is classified as Near Threatened.
 Ixia scillaris var. latifolia is classified as Least Concern due it being widespread and common and not in danger of extinction.

References

External links 

 

 

scillaris
 
Plants described in 1762
Taxa named by Carl Linnaeus